Aliman is a commune in Constanța County, Northern Dobruja, Romania. It includes four villages:
 Aliman
 Dunăreni (historical name: Mârleanu or Mîrleanu until 1968)
 Floriile (historical name: Bac Cuius)
 Vlahii (historical name: Vlahchioi)

The Dacian fortress of Sacidava was located close to the village of Dunăreni.

According to Bogdan Petriceicu Hasdeu, in a hypothesis endorsed by Iorgu Iordan, the name Aliman derives from the Turkish word for "German", Alaman or Aleman''.

Demographics
At the 2011 census, Aliman had 2,798 Romanians (99.75%), 5 Roma  (0.18%), 2 others (0.07%).

Natives of Aliman
 Dan Spătaru, singer

References

Communes in Constanța County
Localities in Northern Dobruja
Populated places on the Danube
Place names of Turkish origin in Romania